Zbigniew Jaskowski (15 March 1929 – 7 June 2006) was a Polish footballer. He played in one match for the Poland national football team in 1952. He was also part of Poland's squad for the football tournament at the 1952 Summer Olympics, but he did not play in any matches.

References

1929 births
2006 deaths
Polish footballers
Poland international footballers
Association football forwards
Wisła Kraków players